John Edward Conner (born June 8, 1987) is a former American football fullback. Conner earned a 2009 College Football All-America Team selection and was one of the best fullback prospects in the 2010 NFL Draft. He was drafted in the fifth round by the New York Jets. He is nicknamed "The Terminator" because of the name he shares with the main character from the popular movie franchise and because of his aggressive blocking style against defensive players.

High school career
Conner attended Lakota West High School in West Chester, Ohio, where he was a two-year starter at running back. He rushed for 1,100 yards and 14 touchdowns, averaging 6.3 yards per carry, as a senior. That year, Lakota West gained an 8–3 record and a berth in the state playoffs. Conner was subsequently named first-team All-Greater Miami Conference and honorable-mention All-Southwest Ohio.

Unrecognized as a prospect by the two major recruiting services, Rivals.com and Scout.com, Conner was not offered an athletic scholarship, although he received some recruiting attention from Kentucky, Tennessee, West Virginia, and Illinois, among others. He eventually chose to walk on with the Kentucky Wildcats.

College career
As a true freshman at Kentucky, Conner appeared in the first three games of the 2005 season on special teams before sustaining a season-ending injury. He received a medical redshirt and retained the year of eligibility.

In his redshirt freshman season, Conner played in all 13 games, starting the first three at fullback. In his sophomore year he also played all 13 games, starting four. He scored four touchdowns and also made two tackles in kick coverage.

By his junior year, Kentucky frequently opened with a fullback in the lineup, giving him 11 starts in 13 games. In a game versus Georgia, Conner set career highs with seven rushes for 26 yards.

Prior to his senior season, Conner was named the "best blocking back" in the Southeastern Conference in the Birmingham News 2009 preseason edition. After a solid performance throughout the season, Conner earned All-American honors by Pro Football Weekly, which places an extra premium on talent and draft value in the selection process.

Professional career

2010 NFL Draft

Considered one of the best fullbacks available in the 2010 NFL Draft, Conner was selected in the fifth round (139th overall) by the New York Jets.

New York Jets

In 2012, Conner struggled with an MCL sprain and hamstring injury, and was released by the Jets on October 17.

Cincinnati Bengals
Conner was signed by the Cincinnati Bengals on December 15, 2012, after the team placed fullback Chris Pressley on the injured reserve list. Conner was released by the Bengals on August 31, 2013. In an episode of Hard Knocks, Bengals coaches stated that though Conner was the best Fullback on the roster, they were keeping Orson Charles due to his special teams play, even going as far as showing Charles game film of Conner after the decision.

New York Giants
After working out with the Buffalo Bills, Conner was signed to a two-year contract by the New York Giants on September 25, 2013, replacing Henry Hynoski, who suffered a fractured shoulder in Week 3 of the regular season.

Second stint with the New York Jets
Conner was re-signed by the New York Jets on September 30, 2014 after fullback Tommy Bohanon suffered a broken collarbone.

Buffalo Bills
Conner signed with the Buffalo Bills on May 13, 2015, reuniting with his former head coach Rex Ryan. On September 4, 2015, he was released by the Bills.

References

External links
Cincinnati Bengals bio
Kentucky Wildcats bio

1987 births
Living people
Players of American football from Cincinnati
American football fullbacks
Kentucky Wildcats football players
New York Jets players
Cincinnati Bengals players
New York Giants players
Buffalo Bills players